Sisilia Nasiga Rasokisoki (born 16 December 1979) is a Fijian judoka.

Nasiga competed at the 2002 Commonwealth Games in Manchester, where she won bronze in the women's 70 kg. She has won gold at both the South Pacific Games and the South Pacific Judo Championships. In 2008 Nasiga took 3rd place in the 70-kg division in the Zen Nihon Gakusei Taijuubetsu Taikai "All Japan University Student Weight Division Tournament" while she represented Fukuoka Keizai University.  She  qualified to compete at the 2008 Summer Olympics in Beijing, where she was Fiji's only representative in judo. She had previously competed at the 2004 Summer Olympics in Athens.

Nasiga was defeated by Edith Bosch of the Netherlands at the Beijing Games.

References

External links

 Sisilia Nasiga's profile at Sports Reference.com

1979 births
Living people
Fijian female judoka
Olympic judoka of Fiji
Judoka at the 2004 Summer Olympics
Judoka at the 2008 Summer Olympics
Judoka at the 2002 Commonwealth Games
I-Taukei Fijian people
Commonwealth Games silver medallists for Fiji
Commonwealth Games medallists in judo
20th-century Fijian women
21st-century Fijian women
Medallists at the 2002 Commonwealth Games